Barun Bicky Chakraborty (28 August 1943 – 26 August 2022) was an Indian-born Swedish businessman. He was the president and founder of Elite Hotels of Sweden and The Bishop's Arms. He was counted as one of the richest men in Scandinavia.

Biography
Chakraborty came to Sweden from Calcutta, India in 1966 to study Sociology at the University of Stockholm. He saw that student dormitories were empty over the summer and began pushing the dorm Domus as a discount hotel to rent out those who were located near Stureplan in Stockholm. Chakraborty managed to acquire these properties from the student association in private hands and they became due plate in his hotel empire. Later he went on to buy the rundown city hotel (sv) and rehabilitate it. In 1980, he bought Hotel in London, a historic city hotel from 1858. At this time there were several run down city hotels around the country. Swedish hospitality was most focused on motels near urban areas. Chakraborty saw this opportunity to revive the ancient city hotel tradition, but in a more modern form. Bicky Chakraborty owned and operated the hotel chain Elite (sv), which covers several historically important city hotels in the country, including Hotel Knaust (sv) in Sundsvall, Hotel Mollberg (sv) in Helsingborg, Hotel Savoy (sv) in Malmö and the City Hotel in Västerås. Bicky Chakraborty's hotel business is the only Swedish-owned hotel chain in Sweden.

Awards and recognition
In 2008, Chakraborty was awarded the Royal Patriotic Society Business Medal for having contributed to the development of Swedish industry. He was also the winner of the Pravasi Bharatiya Samman awarded by the Government of India. Chakraborty was also member of the Jönköping University Foundation.

Personal life
Chakraborty married Ylva Lindberg, the sister of Princess Marianne Bernadotte.

References

External links

1943 births
2022 deaths
Bengali Hindus
Businesspeople from Kolkata
Indian emigrants to Sweden
Swedish people of Indian descent
Swedish hoteliers
Swedish Hindus
Stockholm University alumni
Recipients of Pravasi Bharatiya Samman